Joona Erving (born 2 September 1994) is a Finnish professional ice hockey player, who currently playing for HK Olimpija of the ICE Hockey League.

Career statistics

References

External links

1994 births
Living people
Sportspeople from Oulu
Asplöven HC players
Finnish ice hockey defencemen
Iisalmen Peli-Karhut players
JYP Jyväskylä players
KeuPa HT players
HK Poprad players
Finnish expatriate ice hockey players in Slovakia
Finnish expatriate ice hockey players in Slovenia
Finnish expatriate ice hockey players in Sweden